Miracle Mirror is an album by Dutch rock band Golden Earring, released in 1968 (see 1968 in music). This is the first Golden Earring album to include lead vocalist Barry Hay.

Track listing
All songs written by Gerritsen and Kooymans.

Original track listing

Side 1
"The Truth About Arthur" – 2:54
"Circus Will Be in Town in Time" – 3:25
"Crystal Heaven" – 3:50
"Sam and Sue" – 1:41
"I've Just Lost Somebody" – 3:05
"Mr. Fortune's Wife" – 3:15

Side 2
"Who Cares?" – 3:44
"Born a Second Time" – 2:38
"Magnificent Magistral" – 2:43
"Must I Cry?" - 2:16
"Nothing Can Change This World of Mine" - 3:22
"Gipsy Rhapsody" - 3:19

2009 CD reissue bonus tracks
"Sound of the Screaming Day"
"She Won’t Come to Me"
"Together We Live, Together We Love"
"I Wonder"
"Dong-Dong-Di-Ki-Di-Gi-Dong"
"Wake Up Breakfast"
"Just a Little Bit of Peace in My Heart"
"Remember My Friend"

Personnel
George Kooymans — guitar, vocals
Rinus Gerritsen — bass, keyboard
Barry Hay — guitar, flute, vocals
Jaap Eggermont — drums

References

Golden Earring albums
1968 albums
Polydor Records albums